Philonomon luminans is a species of dragonfly in the family Libellulidae. It is found in South Africa, Central Africa, Democratic Republic of Congo, Equatorial Guinea and Zambia, Encyclopedia of LifeMozambique, Botswana, Namibia, Kenya, Malawi, Tanzania, Uganda, and possibly Burundi. Its natural habitats are dry savanna, moist savanna, subtropical or tropical dry shrubland, subtropical or tropical moist shrubland, shrub-dominated wetlands, swamps, freshwater marshes, and intermittent freshwater marshes.

References
 Clausnitzer, V. 2005.  Philonomon luminans.   2006 IUCN Red List of Threatened Species.   Downloaded on 10 August 2007.

Libellulidae
Taxonomy articles created by Polbot